is a Japanese mixed-media franchise of Japanese role-playing video games and toys, created and developed by Level-5. The first game in the series was released for the Nintendo 3DS in 2013. Three main sequels and several spinoffs, on both Nintendo and mobile platforms, have been released. In December 2019, they expanded to PlayStation with the release of Yo-kai Watch 4++.

Six manga adaptations have also been produced; one, a series that began serialization in Shogakukan's CoroCoro Comic from December 2012 to December 2022, became an award winner. An anime television series produced by OLM, Inc. began airing in Japan from January 2014 and was a ratings success, boosting the franchise in popularity, and began airing in North America from September 2015. An animated film was released in December 2014; with three more films being produced. As of 2022, the game series had sold over 17 million copies worldwide.

Despite not meeting Level-5's expectations in the United States, the franchise still enjoyed a successful U.S. launch, with the original 3DS game selling 400,000 units, as well as toys and an airing of the TV series on Disney XD in the United States on September 5, 2015. However, interest in the Yo-kai Watch franchise steadily declined, and Hasbro's Yo-kai Watch toy line was discontinued in the United States in 2017 and in Europe and Latin America in 2018.

Concept 

The franchise was first thought up as a Doraemon IP, something that could be long lasting over a long period of time. Akihiro Hino, CEO of Level-5, researched extensively what makes a franchise long-lasting, and came up with Yo-kai Watch.

Yo-kai Watch revolves around befriending Yo-kai that are haunting the city. They are based on traditional yōkai (Japanese mythical creatures), but often with clever twists. If one befriends a Yo-kai they get their friendship medal, an object that allows one to summon Yo-kai. With these, they can summon Yo-kai to either fight other Yo-kai, befriend others, or solve everyday tasks.

The basic plot for most of the media is that the main character (either Nate or Katie) obtains a Yo-kai Watch through Whisper, a butler Yo-kai. They then befriend Jibanyan, a cat Yo-kai who haunts an intersection because he thinks his owner from when he was alive named Amy called him lame for getting hit by a truck. During the anime's run, other Yo-kai were introduced.

Media

Main series 

The main video game series is a role-playing video game where the player befriends Yo-kai, and fights the bad ones that seek to rule over the world. The main emphasis in the games is placed on fighting the Yo-kai. All of the main series' games up to Yo-kai Watch 2 have the same battle style; using the 3DS's touchscreen during battles to rotate amongst the player's Yo-kai at will. All of the Yo-kai have powerful moves called Soultimates; some being healing moves, but most of them being offensive. In Yo-kai Watch 3, the battle system was changed into more of a grid-based movement system, and the added use of the Dream Link to use the Yo-kai Blaster against foes during battle.

Yo-kai Watch 

The first game in the main series, Yo-kai Watch, was announced at the 2011 Tokyo Game Show and first released in Japan on July 11, 2013. It sets the foundation for the rest of the video game franchise, introducing all of the main mechanics. The game was released in North America on November 6, 2015 and in Europe on April 29, 2016.

Yo-kai Watch 2 

The second main game in the series, was released in Japan on July 10, 2014 as two versions, Bony Spirits and Fleshy Souls. Yo-kai Watch 2 expands the areas to be explored, with nearly 100 new Yo-kai in the present day of the Kemamoto region (called Harrisville outside of Japan) and the past, where the player time travels to meets traditional Yo-kai and sees their grandfather, who made the predecessor to the Yo-kai Watch. A third version, Psychic Specters, was released on December 12, 2014 to coincide with the first Yo-kai Watch film Yo-kai Watch: Tanjō no Himitsu da Nyan!. Psychic Specters featured characters and scenarios not initially included in Bony Spirits and Fleshy Souls.

Bony Spirits and Fleshy Souls were localized in English and released in the United States on September 30, 2016 (April 7, 2017 in Europe). The localized Bony Spirits and Fleshy Souls received the Oni Evolution update on September 14, 2017, making those games compatible with save data from the western release of Psychic Specters on September 29, 2017.

Yo-kai Watch 3 

In Japan, Yo-kai Watch 3 was announced alongside Yo-kai Watch Busters in April 2015 and released with the "Sushi" and "Tempura" versions on July 16, 2016. Two main characters are playable at the same time: Nate Adams and Hailey Anne. The first half of the game has Nate and his family moving from Springdale to the United States which is called BBQ in the localization, in the fictional town of St. Peanutsburg, where new American-themed  Yo-kai can be found. The other half of the game focuses on a new character, Hailey Anne Thomas, and her partner Yo-kai Usapyon, who run a detective agency together. A third version, Sukiyaki, was eventually released in Japan on December 16, 2016. Sukiyaki combines Sushi and Tempura into one game, as well as additional exclusives.

On September 27, 2018, Nintendo of America announced that Yo-kai Watch 3 was getting a localization release outside of Japan, which released December 16, 2018 in Europe and January 2019 in North America.

Yo-kai Watch 4 

Yo-kai Watch 4 was released for the Nintendo Switch in Japan on June 20, 2019. It features character designs from Yo-kai Watch Shadowside, as well as the original designs. The game also includes characters from previous games, as well as the main characters from Yo-kai Watch: Forever Friends.

An enhanced version, Yo-kai Watch 4++, was later released both as paid DLC as well as at retail for both the Switch and PlayStation 4 on December 5, 2019.

An English localization was under consideration as confirmed by Level-5 during Anime Expo 2019, but due to the company's American branch shutting down, the status of the game's localization is currently unknown.

Other video games

Blasters 

A spin-off game,  was first announced in the April 2015 issue of CoroCoro Comic alongside Yo-kai Watch 3. Busters allowed up to four players to cooperate in battling boss Yo-kai. A free expansion for the two Yo-kai Watch Blasters games called  was released on December 12, 2015, adding characters and settings featured in second anime feature film Yo-kai Watch: Enma Daiō to Itsutsu no Monogatari da Nyan!.

The sequel games are compatible with save data from the first games as well as the three versions of Yo-kai Watch 3.

The first game was localized in English regions as Yo-kai Watch Blasters, where it was released on September 7, 2018. The game would be released outside Japan under the same two version branding, as Red Cat Corps and White Dog Squad. A free update for both games, Moon Rabbit Crew, was released on September 27, 2018.

Busters 2 has not been localized into English and it will most likely not release due to the fact that the Nintendo 3DS production was discontinued.

Other associated games 
The Data Carddass game  was first location tested in late December 2013, and debuted at the Next Generation World Hobby Fair Winter 2014 before being released in early 2014. The game is played much like Bandai's other Data Carddass games, in which the player uses an interface resembling a slot machine to determine the events of a battle between 3 of the player's Yo-kai against 3 enemy Yo-kai, after the player sought them out on the game interface. Winning the game awards the player a card that can be used for future Tomodachi UkiUkipedia play.

 was announced alongside Busters and Yo-kai Watch 3 in April 2015. Sangokushi was made in collaboration with Koei Tecmo's Romance of the Three Kingdoms series as well as several mobile games.

On June 27, 2018, Level-5 and GungHo Online Entertainment announced the release of Yo-kai Watch World, in a special live stream on that day. (Before the same-day release of the game, it was teased online as a "game that will shock the world", as stated from Level-5.) Said to compete with Pokémon Go, it featured many new gameplay mechanics, as well as the battle sequences being similar to the original 3DS games. Currently, it is only able to work within Japan, as other locations do not mostly work outside of Japan. Service for Yo-kai Watch World was discontinued on December 23rd, 2022.

Console-based spin-offs 
 Yo-kai Watch Blasters (Nintendo 3DS, 2015) – released worldwide (outside Korea) on September 7, 2018, with Moon Rabbit Crew update released on September 27, 2018
 Yo-kai Watch Dance: Just Dance Special Version (Wii U, 2015) – Exclusive to Japan, developed by Ubisoft as part of the Just Dance series
 Yo-kai Sangokushi (Nintendo 3DS, 2016) – Japan only, Collaboration with Koei Techmo's Romance of the Three Kingdoms series
 Yo-kai Watch Busters 2: Secret of the Legendary Treasure Bambalaya (Nintendo 3DS, 2017) — Japan only
 Yo-kai Watch Jam: Yo-kai Academy Y – Waiwai Gakuen Seikatsu (Nintendo Switch, 2020) — Japan only

Smartphone apps 
 Yo-kai Land (iOS, Android, 2015) – Produced by Hasbro
  (iOS, Android, 2013)
  (iOS, Android, 2015)
  (iOS, Android, 2018)
  (iOS, Android, 2018)
  (iOS, Android, 2018) – Co-produced with Koei Tecmo
  (iOS, Android, June 27, 2018) – Co-produced by GungHo Online Entertainment inc., with a Google Maps-based engine
  (iOS, Android, 2019) – Co-produced with Netmarble

Manga and comics 

Six manga adaptations based on the series have been published by Shogakukan. A series by Noriyuki Konishi began serialization in CoroCoro Comic from December 15, 2012. This series has been licensed by Viz Media under its Perfect Square imprint for its North American releases up to Volume 10, and is now directly from Viz Media as of Volume 11. In other countries (like Europe, for example), it is under the Kazé imprint.

A shōjo manga series by Chikako Mori, titled , began serialization in Ciao magazine from December 27, 2013. In this series, it was based on the alternate timeline, in which Katie Forester would receive the Yo-kai Watch. This is in contrast to the main timeline, where Nate Adams is the primary.

A yonkoma series by Coconas Rumba, titled , has been serialized in CoroCoro Comic SPECIAL from August 30, 2014 to June 30, 2018.

Another yonkoma series by Santa Harukaze, titled , began serialization in CoroCoro Ichiban! from April 2015.

A series by Shō Shibamoto, titled , began serialization in the seinen manga magazine Hibana on April 10, 2015 and ended on September 10 of that year.

A manga series based on Yo-kai Watch Blasters by Atsushi Ohba began serialization in CoroCoro Comic in June 2015 and ended in October of that year.

A comic book series was announced in January 2017, courtesy of IDW Publishing, and was released in May 2017.

Noriyuki Konishi version 
Loosely based on the main Yo-kai Watch series, a manga series by Noriyuki Konishi started serialization before the release of Yo-kai Watch on the 3DS, and the debut of the original Yo-kai Watch anime. In the series, the art style was different from the current designs, like the early design of the Yo-kai Watch, and also has different character personalities. As the games and anime were released, the manga kept the art style, but the characters also slowly developed over time.

Volume 16 transitioned the manga into the current "Yo-kai Watch!" anime timeline, while still keeping the art style of the previous edition.

Yo-kai Watch: Exciting Nyanderful Days

Yo-kai Watch: 4-Panel Pun-Club

Yo-kai Watch Busters

4-Panel Yo-kai Watch: Geragera Manga Theater

Komasan: A Time for Fireworks and Miracles

Anime 

An anime television series based on the game, produced by OLM, began airing in Japan on Disney XD on October 5, 2015. Most of the episodes focus on Nathan "Nate" Adams solving problems caused by Yo-kai. It has a higher focus on comedy than the games. Some of the episodes have a "Mini-Corner" which features one of the main Yo-kai characters.

On April 7, 2015, Level-5 unveiled a promotional video for a third season of the anime series, which premiered in July 2015. The third season features a new protagonist named Hailey Anne Thomas and her Yo-kai companion Usapyon. It also features new models of the Yo-kai Watch called the "Yo-kai Watch Model U" and the "Yo-kai Watch Dream" model. The third season of the anime series premiered on January 6, 2017, and entered a Busters Arc in July. In February 2018, a sequel series titled Yo-kai Watch Shadowside started airing after the original series ended on March 30, 2018. The first two episodes of the Shadowside anime were broadcast as an hour-long special on April 13, 2018. The Yo-kai Watch Shadowside anime lasted for over 49 episodes, ending on March 29, 2019.

A revival series known as Yo-kai Watch! ran from April 5, 2019 to December 20, 2019 in Japan. It is a continuation of the original series, while serving as a sort of prologue to the fourth movie, in which Nate receives the Yo-kai Watch Elder Version K, which looks like the same watch as the Yo-kai Watch Elder used in Yo-kai Watch Shadowside. While introducing some new Yo-kai, some elements of Shadowside still retain in the new series, like the Yo-kai Arks, and the Shadowside Tribes that were used, for example.

Yo-kai Watch Jam: Yo-kai Academy Y: Close Encounters of the N Kind ran from December 27, 2019 to April 2, 2021. It is a follow-up to the sixth movie.

Another revival series, Yo-kai Watch ♪ started airing on April 9, 2021 which reuses aspects more based on the first season. In the series Nate now uses a "enhanced" version of the original Yo-kai Watch which can recognize all different types of medals.

In the course of the franchise's history, six Yo-kai Watch movies have been made. The first one, Yo-kai Watch: The Movie, was released in Japan on December 20, 2014,
The second, Yo-kai Watch: Enma Daiō to Itsutsu no Monogatari da Nyan!, was released in Japan on December 19, 2015, and the third movie, Yo-kai Watch: Soratobu Kujira to Double no Sekai no Daibōken da Nyan!, an anime and live action movie, was released in Japan on December 17, 2016 The fourth film, Yo-kai Watch Shadowside: Oni-ō no Fukkatsu, opened in Japan on December 16, 2017. A fifth movie, Yo-kai Watch: Forever Friends, released in Japanese theatres on December 14, 2018. A sixth movie, Yo-kai Watch Jam the Movie: Yo-Kai Academy Y - Can a Cat be a Hero?, was released in Japanese theatres on December 13, 2019.

The series is being released on DVD box sets, along with rental DVDs, in Japan by Kadokawa Media Factory. Every episode to date is available for streaming on multiple video on demand services in Japan, such as Hulu and Rakuten Video Showtime.

Overseas 
At the premiere of the Yo-kai Watch film, Level-5's president Akihiro Hino officially announced that the Yo-kai Watch anime would begin broadcast internationally in 2015. He also jokingly requested Etsuko Kozakura and Tomokazu Seki, who voice Jibanyan and Whisper respectively, to "study English".

In North America 
Dentsu Entertainment USA announced in April 2014 that they were seeking broadcast and merchandising partners in North America for the anime. The anime began broadcast as a 26-episode season on Disney XD on October 5, 2015, with the official Yo-kai Watch YouTube channel posting episodes a month later.  Since the show had performed well, a second season (no relation to the Japanese second season) with an additional 50 episodes was broadcast on August 1, 2016. The third season premiered on July 2, 2018 on Disney XD in the United States, and ended on December 29, 2018. In 2019, Disney XD removed the Yo-kai Watch anime from its lineup due to declining ratings; but eventually returned to the network in a weekend-only timeslot in January 2020, re-taking the place of a previous replacement, Inazuma Eleven: Ares. The first season's first volume was released on DVD by NCircle Entertainment on February 26, 2019, and one version of that set comes with a free comic book. The first season's second volume was released on September 3, 2019.

The first movie was also brought over, as a special screening one day screening, on October 15, 2016. This was only in the US, via Fathom Events. Those who attended got a Hovernyan medal.
Outside of the US, the first season and the movie used to be available to stream on Netflix, but as of now, it is no longer available to stream.

The English version of the anime dub used a cast from Sprite Animation Studios for the first two seasons, but they were replaced in the third season with actors from SDI Media due to budget costs and low ratings on Disney XD.

MarVista Entertainment has licensed the series in Latin America.

In Europe and Africa 
Viz Media Europe has licensed the series in Europe, Russia, and Africa. They premiered the anime in the UK and Ireland on Cartoon Network on April 23, 2016. In France it showed on three different stations: Boing in April, 2016, Gulli in September, 2016, and Cartoon Network France in March, 2017. Other countries it aired in are Germany and Austria (Nickelodeon), Spain and Africa on Boing, Belgium and the Netherlands on Nickelodeon, and Israel on Noga. Cartoon Network also has it airing on their Portugal, Turkey, Poland and the Nordic, Central and Eastern Europe feeds, starting in Spring 2016.

Viz has also hired Bulldog Licensing and German brand-management company m4e to represent the brand in the UK and German-speaking territories, respectively.

Asia 
An alternative English dub began airing on Cartoon Network Asia and Toonami Asia in Asian countries from June 27, 2015. The alternative English dub uses the original Japanese names.

Shogakukan Asia also licensed the series in the Philippines. Similarly, for a few years, GMA Network also made a Tagalog dub of the original anime.

For Yo-kai Watch Shadowside, a subbed version air in the Southeast Asia area, in 2019 via Animax Asia.

In Australia and New Zealand 
The Fusion Agency acquired the licensing and merchandising rights for the series in Australia and New Zealand. It aired in Australia on 9Go! on December 14, 2015.

Music 
The music for the games and anime series is composed by Level-5 employee Kenichiro Saigo. The following themes are used in both the video games and anime series. In the original anime, all opening themes are performed by King Cream Soda, with lyrics by m.o.v.e vocalist Motsu. The anime themes are also dubbed into English for its North American broadcast.

Recent seasons of the anime have had opening and ending themes performed by Japanese YouTubers such as Soraru, Rinu, and Strawberry Prince.

Merchandise 

Various toys, such as the eponymous Yo-kai Watch and Yo-kai Medals, have been produced based on the series, receiving high commercial success. Hasbro released a toy line based on the series worldwide in December 2015. In July 2016, Square Enix's MMORPG Final Fantasy XIV: A Realm Reborn held a special crossover event lasting until October which allowed players to gather Medals from existing in-game battles and exchange them for minions modeled after the franchise's titular Yo-kai as well as weapons inspired by them.  In January 2018, McDonald's began offering Yo-kai Watch toys in US Happy Meals, alongside the much more popular Shopkins.

Reception 
The original Yo-kai Watch game received a score of 36/40 from Famitsu, with its sequel Yo-kai Watch 2 also scoring 36/40. Yo-kai Watch 2 won the Grand Prize in the Japan Game Awards. It also won 3 other awards: The Best Sales Award, and two Excellence Awards (for the 2nd game and its third version). In 2014, Yo-kai Watch'''s manga in CoroCoro Comic won the 38th Kodansha Manga Award in the Best Children's Manga category. In the following year, it also was awarded the Best Children's manga at the 60th Shogakukan Manga Awards.

When the anime first aired, in 2014, the franchise became popular in Japan. By February, the first game, which originally sold only 53,654 copies, was at over 500,000 shipped and the anime was surpassing Pokémon in the TV rankings; being compared to it and being dubbed the "Pokémon Killer". By the second game's release, the first game had sold 1,195,287 copies and the second game surpassed that at release at 1,316,707 copies. The third version also impressed, at 1,244,171 units.

Even the president of Level-5, Akihiro Hino, was surprised by Yo-kai Watch's popularity. "While I did believe that it would get its break, honestly, to have it come this far, where the children of Japan would get so hopped-up on Yo-kai, to the point where all the goods would sell out, is something I didn’t expect." They were the second most popular characters in Japan, in a survey by Video Research Ltd. Explanations for its popularity ranged from catchy songs and dances, to being something parents and kids could enjoy together, to "weird adults" not being interested in it. Hino himself said that it was the relatable characters and situations relatable to modern kids that made it popular.

This also translated into toy sales, racking in 55.2 billion yen for Namco Bandai. Yo-kai Watch toys were frequently out of stock; people having to wait in lotteries to get a Yo-kai Watch and search hard for medals. Other merchandise had to wait longer because of the long licensing wait times. This demand made it the second highest product in Nikkei Trendy that year.

It was a top seller in many other areas as well: The Yo-kai Watch Guide was the number one book in 2014,  its first theme song, Geragerapo no Uta, was the number 50 song on the Oricon Singles Chart, and the movie had the highest opening of any Japanese film since 2000. Yo-kai Watch even had a special segment on Kohaku Uta Gassen,  Japan's most viewed music program.

By 2015, sales had started to fall to numbers ranging from around a quarter to 1/8 of what they were the previous year. Prices were cut and there was less visible excitement among children. By the time the third games were released, in 2016, it was on a downward slope with the game launching with about half of what the second games did, with 632,135 units and the third version of the game launched with half of what the first versions sold with 337,979 units. The toy sales were 10.4 billion yen in toy sales and estimated to be at 6.3 billion yen in 2017. This was largely due to hype building for two games that were coming from Nintendo's Pokémon franchise, the Pokémon Go smartphone app and Pokémon Sun and Moon for the 3DS.

In addition to the wake of Pokémon's renewed popularity, analysts had a few other theories on why Yo-kai Watch was falling. Ken Hōri of The Business Journal and Ollie Barder of Forbes thought it was mainly distribution issues; products that were ordered from the summer vacation were over stocked, because of the six-month waiting period for copyright approvals. Another reason he had was that the toys had incompatible medals with later watches, leading to a loss of interest. Barder and Sato of Siliconera also mentioned oversaturation, with it being Sato's main focus.

Unlike in its native Japan where it experienced a short period of great popularity, Yo-kai Watch had an overall underwhelming performance in the United States. Although it got off to a promising start in that region, with the original game selling at least 400,000 units there as of 2016, the sequel, Yo-kai Watch 2'', sold less than 200,000 copies in comparison. Meanwhile, Disney XD's English broadcast of the anime series has estimated only 100,000-300,000 viewers per episode, and was removed from the network's schedule in 2017. Despite the franchise's unsatisfactory western response, it maintains a cult following with many attempts to revive the franchise such as #SaveYoKaiWatch which trended on Twitter. The franchise is also popular in Europe, with the original game's sales out pacing the Japanese release as of October 2016.

Notes

References

External links 

 
 
 Watch Yo-kai Watch TV Show | Disney XD on DisneyNOW
 
 
 
 

2015 anime television series debuts
2018 anime television series debuts
2019 anime television series debuts
2021 anime television series debuts
 
Animated television series about children
Anime television series based on video games
Children's manga
Comedy anime and manga
Japanese children's animated comedy television series
Japanese adult animated comedy television series
Japanese children's films
Children's animated films
Children's film series
Japanese film series
Japanese adult animated films
Japanese mythology in anime and manga
Level-5 (company) franchises
Level-5 (company) games
Manga based on video games
Nintendo games
OLM, Inc.
Shogakukan franchises
Shogakukan manga
Supernatural anime and manga
TV Tokyo original programming
Video game franchises introduced in 2013
Video games about children
Viz Media manga
Winners of the Shogakukan Manga Award for children's manga
Yōkai in popular culture
Yōkai in anime and manga
Medialink